White Oak Creek is a stream in Harrison County in the U.S. state of Missouri. It is a tributary of Sampson Creek.

The stream headwaters arise at  approximately one mile southeast of Martinsville and it flows to the south passing under US Route 136 two miles east of New Hampton. It continues to the south-southwest crossing under Missouri Route P one half mile west of the small community of Matkins.

White Oak Creek most likely was named for the white oak trees lining its course.

See also
List of rivers of Missouri

References

Rivers of Harrison County, Missouri
Rivers of Missouri